= Louise Rose Babaud de la Chaussade =

Louise Rose Babaud de la Chaussade (1747-1817), was a French memoir writer. She is known for her memoirs, describing her life during the French Revolution. Her memoirs how she managed the major iron works industry during the imprisonment of her spouse during the Reign of Terror.
